Antonia: A Portrait of the Woman is a 1974 documentary about symphony conductor Antonia Brico, including her struggle against gender bias in her profession.  The film was directed by Judy Collins and Jill Godmilow. It was nominated for an Academy Award for Best Documentary Feature.

In 2003, the film was deemed "culturally, historically, or aesthetically significant" by the United States Library of Congress and selected for preservation in the National Film Registry.

See also
 List of American films of 1974
A Woman Is a Risky Bet: Six Orchestra Conductors, a 1987 documentary film

References

External links
 
 Antonia: A Portrait of the Woman essay by Daniel Eagan in America's Film Legacy: The Authoritative Guide to the Landmark Movies in the National Film Registry, A&C Black, 2010 , pages 707-709 
 
 Antonia: A Portrait of the Woman at Direct Cinema Limited

1974 films
American documentary films
United States National Film Registry films
Documentary films about women
Documentary films about classical music and musicians
Films about pianos and pianists
1974 documentary films
Women in classical music
1970s English-language films
1970s American films